Hondo is an unincorporated community in northern Alberta within the Municipal District of Lesser Slave River No. 124, located  east of Highway 2,  northwest of Edmonton.

Localities in the Municipal District of Lesser Slave River No. 124